Kevin John Minson (born 5 May 1947) is a former Australian politician.

He was born in Port Hedland and was a farmer and dental surgeon before entering politics. In 1989 he was elected to the Western Australian Legislative Assembly as the Liberal member for Greenough. He immediately won promotion to the front bench as Shadow Minister for Conservation, Land Management, Waterways and Midwest, and held a variety of shadow portfolios over the next term, as well as becoming Deputy Leader of the Opposition from 1990 to 1992. In 1993, with the Liberal Party's election victory, he became Minister for the Environment, Aboriginal Affairs and Disability Services, trading Environment for Works and Services in 1995 and later adding Mines in 1996. He stepped down from the front bench in 1997 and retired in 2001.

References

1947 births
Living people
Liberal Party of Australia members of the Parliament of Western Australia
Members of the Western Australian Legislative Assembly
People from Port Hedland, Western Australia
21st-century Australian politicians